Sally Boazman (born 13 September 1957) is a British radio traffic news reporter on the national radio station BBC Radio 2. Her reporting revolutionised United Kingdom traffic news with the addition of live reports from motorists on mobile phones and lorry drivers on CB radio.

Boazman now presentes Radio 2's weekend travel bulletins since 2014, currently alongside Orna Merchant.

Career
Following a brief foray into acting, Boazman took a post in the current affairs department of LWT where she worked as a secretary for the future Director-General of the BBC Greg Dyke. After later working as a traffic news announcer for the Automobile Association she went on to present traffic reports for a number of local radio stations before moving to Classic FM. Her first presenting role was for the British Forces Broadcasting Service after which she worked for the BBC World Service and commercial radio. She spent some time away from broadcasting following the birth of her son, Harry, but returned later to become Chief Travel Reporter for BBC Radio London.

She joined BBC Radio 2 as the network's first official travel news presenter in 1998, presenting travel updates during the weekday afternoons. She has worked alongside Johnnie Walker, later Chris Evans and Simon Mayo on their respective Drivetime shows, Steve Wright during the afternoon, and Jeremy Vine at lunchtime. Boazman now continues to provide traffic news reports at weekends on BBC Radio 2 with Orna Merchant.

In 2007, Boazman was described by Autotrader UK as the "sexiest voice on the radio" and a national treasure who changed the way traffic reporting was done. Her fans have named a thoroughbred race horse after her, as well as lorry trucks.

Books, records, and activities
In 2003 she narrated the poem Crawl of The Light Brigade for the CD recording Guide Cats for the Blind. In 2007 she wrote the book The Sally Traffic Handbook and narrated a CD for the Highways Agency called Hear When the Going's Good, providing advice to lorry drivers.

TomTom navigation has a Sally Traffic voice available for its GPS units. Proceeds from purchase of the voice driving set go to the charity BBC Children in Need.

From 10 to 19 November 2007, she cycled across  of Kenya's Rift Valley to support charity Transaid. In 2009 she presented the Gold level Sony Radio Academy Award for drivetime entertainment to her fellow broadcaster Chris Evans, while in 2007 the Gold level Entertainment award honoured the Chris Evans Drivetime show and staff, of which Boazman was part. She also won the Truck & Driver Driver's Choice award for Best Traffic Information in 2009.

On 29 October 2011, she presented The Road to Nowhere for BBC One in London and South East England, a documentary celebrating the 25th anniversary of the M25. The programme sees Boazman journeying around the motorway and examining its economic and environmental impact, as well as other ways it has changed Britain's society.

Personal life and pastimes
She lives in Ipswich with her son Harry (born 1987), who is a musician. Truckfest has her as a regular participant, appearing in every event since 2002. A self-professed Francophile, she occasionally takes the Channel Tunnel and subsequently drives from Calais to St-Omer.

References

External links
Sally Boazman's profile at BBC Online
A biography
Vicki Butler-Henderson takes Radio 2's Sally Traffic on a Bentley chauffeur driving course, from Fifth Gear

1957 births
Living people
BBC newsreaders and journalists
British radio presenters
BBC Radio 2 presenters
British motoring journalists
British women radio presenters